Mike Cherry is an American politician. A Republican, he is a member of the Virginia House of Delegates, representing the 66th district since 2021.

References 

Living people
21st-century American politicians
Republican Party members of the Virginia House of Delegates
Year of birth missing (living people)